

Timeline by months

February 
On 4 February 2020, the end of the retention, at customs, of the paper and ink of the newspaper La Prensa was reported. This newspaper confirmed that, through the efforts of the apostolic nuncio, a communication channel was opened with the General Directorate of Customs (DGA) to deliver the retained material.

On 25 February various opposition sectors founded the National Coalition in an act held at the Hispamer Bookstore auditorium in Managua, despite the police siege outside.

From the early hours of 25 February 2020, the Nicaraguan Police kept all the entrances to Managua taken on the same day that the opposition to Daniel Ortega's regime plans to demonstrate to demand the release of political prisoners. At the checkpoints, the officers requisition private vehicles, buses and detain people to question them about the reasons for their visit to the capital. In several places, the police attacked citizens who protested and showed their disagreement with the authoritarian government of Ortega and in these actions the police and civil or paramilitary groups related to Sandinismo attacked and threatened Journalists.

March 
Followers of the ruling Sandinista Front of Nicaragua desecrated on 3 March 2020 with insults, robberies and aggressions the mass present in honor of the late poet and revolutionary priest Ernesto Cardenal in the Cathedral of Managua, denounced the assistants. The attacks began when Bishop Rolando Álvarez spoke and intensified at the conclusion of the ceremony. At least one young opponent and four journalists were beaten, and some of the communicators were robbed of their equipment. Government supporters occupied the benches on the left side and around the church, from where they shouted government slogans and expletives to relatives, friends and opponents who attended the ceremony, which was chaired by the apostolic nuncio Waldemar Stanislaw. Support coup d'état, criminals, free country or die, Long live Sandino!", Shouted the Sandinista supporters carrying flags and handkerchiefs of the Sandinista National Liberation Front (FSLN, left), when the poet's family tried to get his coffin out of the cathedral behind end the mass. At the end of the Mass, the relatives decided to remove the coffin of the poet as soon as possible from the church before the tension increased. They couldn't do it through the front door. They had to remove it from the side of the Cathedral. After the coffin was removed in the funeral carriage of the religious precinct, government supporters and media reporters harassed Gioconda Belli and other assistants. Diplomats and cultural personalities witnessed the embarrassing episodes.

On 5 March 2020, the Office of Foreign Assets Control (OFAC) of the United States Department of the Treasury sanctioned the Nicaraguan National Police (NNP), the main law enforcement entity in Nicaragua, and three NNP commissioners because they are "responsible for human rights abuses in Nicaragua" according to the US Treasury.

On 18 March 2020, Rosario Murillo confirmed Nicaragua's first case in a growing COVID-19 pandemic to be a Nicaraguan man who had recently traveled to Panama. Two days later, a second case of COVID-19 was confirmed for another Nicaraguan who had recently traveled to Colombia. Nicaragua took fewer government actions to address the pandemic than its neighbors. They notably allowed for major sporting events and the annual Easter celebrations to carry on as usual. The health minister justifies this decision by stressing the need to support the Nicaraguan economy, after the recession caused by the protests of the two previous years.

July 
José Luis Rugama Rizo was assassinated when leaving his house with a blue and white face mask and shouting "Viva Nicaragua libre" to a caravan after Ortega's speech this July 19 in Estelí. The murder occurred on Sunday night in the city of Estelí, in the north of Nicaragua, when Jorge Rugama Rizo was outside his house and the Sandinista caravan passed, according to the Nicaraguan Center for Human Rights (Cenidh) and the Nicaraguan Association for Human Rights (ANPDH), which received complaints from the victim's relatives and witnesses to the event.

On July 20, 2020, while burying the murdered opponent, the house of some relatives of the deceased was burned by Nicaraguan social networks, and a campaign was raised to collect funds to meet the main basic needs of the family. The Nicaraguan Police presents on Tuesday July 21, 2020 Abner Onell Pineda Castellon as the main person in charge of José Luis Rugama Rizo 

The family of the released prisoner and youth leader Bayron Estrada, continues to be besieged by the sanctioned Sandinista police, thus the young Estrada announced through his social networks.The family of the former political prisoner and youth leader Bayron Estrada, continues to be besieged by the sanctioned Sandinista police, thus the young Estrada announced through his social networks. The former political prisoner and professor Juan Bautista Guevara denounced in the Permanent Commission on Human Rights (CPDH) the escalation of the siege of the Nicaraguan police, as well as paramilitaries in his home since he was released under the Amnesty Law in 2019. According to Guevara, he and his relatives are subjected to police harassment "every day and at all hours", taking photographs of people entering and leaving the house and even pointing guns at them.

Nicaraguan journalist Gerall Chávez denounced that he was threatened through an anonymous letter sent to his relatives in Carazo y de igual manera, le enviaron un vídeo en el que simulan cómo lo van a matar. On the other hand, the journalist and sports reporter for Radio Corporación, Julio «El Porteño» Jarquín denounced the police siege outside his home. Along the same lines, a police operation moved for hours outside the facilities of Radio Darío in León on the afternoon of July 25, 2020. Since late afternoon, the police chief, Fidel Domínguez located traffic agents in every corner leading to the station. A group of policemen from the Daniel Ortega and Rosario Murillo regime, under the command of the León police chief, Fidel Domínguez, stole a motorcycle and a vehicle from Radio Darío collaborators in the hours of Saturday night, denounced the means of communication on their social networks. The station, located east of the Óscar Danilo Rosales Argüello Hospital (Heodra), in León, spent more than nine hours under siege, before the occupation of the motor vehicles was recorded, according to the director of the media outlet, Aníbal Toruño.

The Nicaraguan Independent Press forum demands the cessation of attacks, intimidations and attacks against the Independent Press by the Ortega Murillo dictatorship, in different parts of the country.

Nicaraguan Vice President Rosario Murillo confirmed that the 41st anniversary of the Sandinista revolution would take place virtually due to "difficulties in these times" (referring to the COVID-19 pandemic that is raging in the country), Murillo announced that virtual concerts and activities will be held for those who like to participate in caravans. Also in the mayoralty of Managua a platform would be placed for the celebration of the anniversary.

Subsequently, various users who opposed the regime proposed a counter-march for July 19, flooding with blue and white flags before the red and black government's withdrawal of the FSLN flag. Users seek to generate actions of rejection in the face of the political crisis in the country and to remember the victims of the anti-government protests that emerged in 2018

Attacks on the Catholic Church in Nicaragua

July 20 
A drunk man broke into a van in the Metropolitan Cathedral of Managua (Nicaragua), and destroyed part of its infrastructure, a fact that was condemned by the local church, which asked the faithful for prayers. In a statement, the Metropolitan Cathedral of the Immaculate Conception of Maria de Managua (Nicaragua) reported that on July 20 at dawn, a drunk man broke into a truck in the Cathedral Church and destroyed three interior doors, and then ran away.

July 25 
The Catholic priest of the Our Lord of Veracruz Catholic Church Pablo Antonio Villafranca Martínez denounced the sacrilegious and robbery in the El Carmen Chapel "this is our complaint we will not put any before anyone else."On the official website of the church, the priest informed the parishioners that criminals entered the chapel and caused damage to the temple “we will have to replace microphones, cables, amplifiers, speakers, locks, padlocks, piggy banks and repair everything. We have nothing but tears, helplessness, pain and frustration."

July 29 
The Nuestra Señora del Perpetuo Socorro chapel in the municipality of Nindirí, in Masaya (Nicaragua), was desecrated with "fury and hatred", because the unknown individuals not only stole custody and the ciborium, but also broke images, trampled the hosts and made other damage.The event occurred this Wednesday, July 29. The priest Jesús Silva, parish priest of the Santa Ana parish, to which the chapel belongs, made the complaint on social networks.

July 31

Cathedral attack 
An unidentified man threw a firebomb into a chapel of Managua's Cathedral of the Immaculate Conception, severely damaging the chapel and a devotional image of Christ more than three centuries old. A fact that has been described as an "act of terrorism" by Cardinal Leopoldo Brenes. The incident occurred in the morning hours, when only two people were inside the chapel. The vice president and first lady, Rosario Murillo, declared to official media that "a fire" occurred because "our people are very devoted" and there were many candles in the place, where a curtain caught fire. However, Cardinal Leopoldo Brenes, archbishop of Managua and president of the Episcopal Conference, refuted Murillo, noting that on the site "there is no candle and we also have no curtains, our chapel has no curtains and has no candles	Brenes connected the fire with another event that occurred on the 20th, in which a man in a van destroyed the gates of the Cathedral, and with the theft of a fence, which served as an escape route for the person causing the fire. A woman who works in the temple told local television channel 14 that a young man asked where the chapel was and, after indicating the place, he heard an explosion and saw the stranger jumping over the walls that protect the place.

Reaction of the opposition 

The Sandinista Renovator Movement (MRS) party condemned the recent attacks against the Catholic Church in Nicaragua, such as the burning of the Chapel of the Blood of Christ in the Metropolitan Cathedral of Managua this Friday morning, “We absolutely condemn all terrorist attacks and vandalism against temples and churches, now against the Cathedral of Managua, which constitute a flagrant violation of religious freedom, enshrined in the Nicaraguan Constitution ” For his part, José Adán Aguerri, President of the Superior Council of Private Enterprise, expressed his solidarity through his Twitter account for this act of terrorism that occurred in the Cathedral of Managua “from COSEP Nicaragua and personally, our solidarity and support for the archdiocese. of Managua and the Nicaraguan Episcopal Conference, before the cowardly attack on the Cathedral of Managua that adds to the acts of vandalism in different chapels in the country in previous days. Intolerance will not succeed, ”says the publication. Opposition coalition Blue and White National Unity (UNAB) condemned the acts of desecration, siege and harassment against the Catholic Church in Nicaragua and ensure that "these acts violate freedom of religion provided for in our Constitution. These events, in addition to being targeted attacks, demonstrate the levels of insecurity experienced by the population at the national level. ” He also added that "the evidence shows that the attacks are being committed by people related to the criminal dictatorship of Daniel Ortega, who maintains a permanent political campaign against priests and the Church. We stand in solidarity with the Catholic Church and the devout and Christian people of our country, in the face of such acts of desecration, ”the UNAB statement continues. The Nicaraguan Center for Human Rights (CENIDH) through a statement expressed its repudiation of what happened in the Chapel of the Blood of Christ of the Cathedral of Managua, burned by an unknown person who threw a Molotov bomb and then fled the scene without leaving trail. "We demand that the authorities INVESTIGATE THE FACTS WITH CELERITY AND FIND THE GUILTY, otherwise we will suppose that it was the Ortega Murillo regime who gave the order to burn down the temple to continue its campaign of hatred and terror against churches, religious and believers that adversity him "expresses part of the Communiqué. Juan Sebastian Chamorro member of the Civic Alliance for Justice and Democracy condemned the facts in a video via the social network Twitter and Father Edwin Roman condemned the attack and indicated that it can burn and destroy the image of the Lord but never Faith and dignity from his people. In this regard, the auxiliary bishop of Managua, Silvio Báez, wrote on his Twitter account: "We have cried together because of the fire that has occurred in the chapel of the venerated image of the Blood of Christ." "Terrorist act associated with paramilitaries of the regime burn down the chapel of the Blood of Christ," denounced the opposition Edipcia Dubón. "I urge your Holiness the Pope to denounce the attacks by Daniel Ortega and his paramilitaries against the Catholic Church, the bishops and priests and the terrorist acts against the Cathedral of Managua," demanded activist Bianca Jagger. The Evangelical Alliance of Nicaragua, the main organization of evangelical Christians in the Central American country, has rejected the attack on the Chapel of the Blood of Christ located in the Cathedral of Managua.

President Ortega appeared through official means to commemorate the 41st anniversary of the Nicaraguan Army Air Force. In his message, Ortega avoided commenting on the suffering of hundreds of stranded Nicaraguans, as well as the terrorist act perpetrated against the Catholic Church.In the act, Ortega highlighted the role of the Air Force during humanitarian emergencies or catastrophes produced by the impact of natural phenomena, but was silent on the humanitarian emergency that more than 500 compatriots have lived on the border of Peñas Blancas for two weeks and on the complicity of the Sandinista Army that expelled several Nicaraguans to Costa Rica who tried to enter the country through blind spots. Nine hours after the terrorist act in the cathedral of Managua, the Nicaraguan National Police issued a statement in which it suggested that an "alcohol spray" could have caused the fire that left the image of the blood of Christ in ashes." At the scene, a plastic spray bottle with alcohol (volatile easily combustion) was found, with one Nicaraguan observer from 100% Noticias stating that "they relate among the findings. It is worth noting that the atomizer was in good physical condition, without being observed melted by the fire that burned the chapel of the blood of Christ in the cathedral.

The Sandinista regime led by Ortega continues its campaign of siege and intimidation against the independent media for showing its public mismanagement against the Nicaraguan population, on the morning of this Saturday, August 1, members of the Nicaraguan Police deployed patrols and riot police units at various points in Managua, including near El Diario La Prensa. From 8:30 in the morning, so too Radio La Costeñisima in Bluefields.

The Inter-American Press Association (IAPA) condemned the aggressions and intimidations of the "authoritarian regime" of Nicaragua against journalists, which, it said, have worsened during the coverage of the pandemic and called on regional governments to exert "more pressure".Faced with allegations of crimes against press freedom made by various journalists' organizations, IAPA President Christopher Barnes and the President of the Committee on Freedom of the Press and Information, Roberto Rock, condemned "the new wave of censorship and attacks "and particularly targeted" public officials, police officers and members of parastatal groups, all motivated by the government of Daniel Ortega. "

International reactions 
The Panamanian Episcopal Conference rejects the act of "vandalism" carried out in the Metropolitan Cathedral of Managua, Nicaragua. When on July 31, 2020, a man threw an explosive device, which caused the chapel that houses the "Blood of Christ and the Most Holy" to catch fire. It causes us deep pain and outrage, seeing how the sensitivity of the Nicaraguan people to such destruction caused by a bomb that burned the chapel of the Metropolitan Cathedral of Managua has been wounded, "the Panamanian organization said in a statement. For his part, the United States Ambassador to Nicaragua, Kevin K. Sullivan, "condemned the attack" and considered this fire to be "one of the series of deplorable attacks on Catholic temples in different parts" of the Central American country. Through a statement, the Latin American Episcopal Council (CELAM) expressed its voice of rejection against the recent events that affected the cathedral of the city of Managua, Nicaragua, where, through the activation of an explosive charge, an attempt was made against the main religious temple in the city, on July 31."We condemn this and any act of sacrilege or desecration that threatens the spiritual life of the faithful and the evangelizing work of the Church, especially in these difficult times of pandemic that we have to live," says the statement.

The OHCHR [Office of the United Nations High Commissioner for Human Rights] condemns yesterday's incendiary attack against the Chapel of La Sangre de Cristo in the Cathedral of Managua, expresses its solidarity with the entire Catholic community and urges the authorities to thoroughly investigate what happened, "said the institution in a message released through its official Twitter account.

The Episcopal Conference of Costa Rica went even further by referring to the incident as a "cowardly attack", which, he noted, "has resulted in the desecration of the sacred species contained in the Tabernacle, as well as the desecration of the venerated image of the Blood of Christ, so loved by the Catholic faithful in the sister Republic of Nicaragua. "" We consider that this criminal act constitutes a frontal attack on the Church in Nicaragua and on religious freedom in this beloved nation, "added the bishops. Costa Ricans in a statement. In Spain, the media, journalists, theologians, religious orders and the Spanish Episcopal Conference expressed their rejection of these violent actions against the Nicaraguan Catholic Church.

August 
The Sandinista regime led by Daniel Ortega continues its campaign of siege and intimidation against the independent media for showing its public mismanagement against the Nicaraguan population, on the morning of this Saturday, August 1, members of the Nicaraguan Police deployed patrols and riot police units at various points in Managua, including near El Diario La Prensa. From 8:30 in the morning, so too Radio La Costeñisima in Bluefields.

Michael Kozak, Acting Assistant Secretary for U.S. Department of State's Bureau of Western Hemisphere Affairs, condemned the attacks and intimidation of the press that occurs in Nicaragua.

Pope Francis condemned the attack carried out by unknown persons last Friday, July 31, 2020, against the Chapel of the Blood of Christ in the Metropolitan Cathedral of Managua, Nicaragua.This Sunday, August 2, 2020, after saying the Sunday prayer for the Angelus, Pope Francis expressed solidarity with the Nicaraguan Christian people.

New attack on another Catholic church. A subject burst into the middle of mass and threw stones on a glass urn and then returned and threw another stone at a Christ who was on the altar of the Church of Santa Rosa de Lima, in the municipality of Santa Rosa del Peñón, León.

An opponent and custodian of the Virgin of Montserrat was killed in a beating in a small Pacific town in Nicaragua, the Catholic Church reported Thursday, whose temples suffer a wave of desecration that has spread since last July. Noel Hernández, 24, died after 48 hours in critical condition after receiving a beating from unknown persons in the San Juan de La Concepción municipality, Masaya department, confirmed the Inmaculada Concepción de María parish.

September 
The Valle family television channel 12 confirmed that they had a millionaire embargo applied to them. Carolina Valle, through a statement, reported that on September 11, Judge Luden Marti Quiros García, Managua's third execution and embargo judge, appeared at the facilities to "carry out an embargo for 21 million cordobas at the request of the Directorate General of Income, DGI ", declared Carolina Valle. According to Valle, the seizure request before the judge was made by the financial assistant attorney, Marlen Isabel Ramiíez Laguna, who imposed an "arbitrary and illegal objection to our income tax returns for the years 2011, 2012 and 2012-2013. " 

The director of Radio Darío in León Anibal Toruño denounced through his Twitter account the harassment and intimidation of this radio station by officials of the National Police of Nicaragua.

October 
Members of the National Coalition are stoned in the city of Masaya where Verónica Chávez, wife of journalist Miguel Mora, was injured in her head and the tomographies certify that Chávez has a cranial fissure and suffered an internal hemorrhage that keeps him in the hospital. The perpetrators of this attack are supporters of President Daniel Ortega and with the complocity of the National Police.The UN condemned the attack

The Nicaraguan Center for Human Rights (Cenidh) warned this Friday that the law on foreign agents approved by parliament the day before gives President Daniel Ortega "totalitarian control" and asked the international community for "urgent action" to reject it. The National Assembly of Nicaragua, with a pro-government majority, approved on Thursday the law regulating foreign agents aimed at controlling the resources that people and organizations receive from external sources.That includes board members, public relations, advertising agents, information service employers, and political consultants, among others. On the contrary, the international media and correspondents, as well as cooperation agencies, humanitarian organizations and accredited religious entities were exempted from the law.

Subjects and entities under this denomination must register with the Ministry of the Interior, report the receipt of funds and how they are spent.This exception would be revoked in the event that their activities derive into interference in internal affairs, according to the regulations.

Opponents to the regime of Daniel Ortega y Periodistas denounce the continuous harassment, attacks and threats of supporters and members of Sandinismo. The opposition National Coalition denounced that dozens of anti-riot agents were stationed this Saturday (10.17.2020) outside a capital hotel where they were holding an assembly with a view to the 2021 general elections, while the exiled journalist Maryórit Guevara denounced that unknown persons marked his home with a phrase that he assumes "as a death threat."

Nicaragua has lost 217,930 formal jobs and has been dragging two consecutive years of economic contraction since 2018, the year in which the civic rebellion against the Daniel Ortega regime began, according to a report released this Saturday by the Central Bank of Nicaragua (BCN). Until last August, Nicaragua closed with 695,867 workers affiliated to the Nicaraguan Social Security Institute (INSS), a figure that represents 3.7% less than the previous year that registered 722,606, according to the Central Bank of Nicaragua.

December 
The Nicaraguan opponent, Félix Maradiaga, assured that during a struggle with the Nicaraguan National Police, which prevented him from leaving a house, he had a broken finger and two others dislocated. Maradiaga, a leading political scientist of the opposition Blue and White National Unit (UNAB), wanted to travel to Bilwi, capital of the northern Caribbean autonomous region, with a shipment of humanitarian aid to deliver to people affected by hurricanes Eta and Iota, which hit that area last month.

The National Assembly of Nicaragua, dominated by the ruling Sandinista Front, approved on December 21, 2020, by a large majority a law that prevents the participation of the opposition in the 2021 elections, while the United States announced new sanctions against three government officials by Daniel Ortega. In an extraordinary session, the bench of 70 Sandinista deputies approved the so-called "Law for the defense of the rights of the people to independence, sovereignty and self-determination for peace." Fourteen deputies of the Liberal Constitutional Party (PLC) voted against it, considering it "unconstitutional." The controversial norm, approved as a matter of urgency, prevents those who the government considers "coup plotters" or "terrorists" from running for public and popularly elected positions, despite the fact that the current constitution establishes full rights to political participation for all citizens without exception .

Two years after the occupation of the Confidencial newsroom, the 100% Noticias channel, the Nicaraguan Center for Human Rights (Cenidh), the Institute for Development and Democracy (Ipade), the Center for Information and Advisory Services in Salud (Cisas) and the Popol Na Foundation, the regime of Daniel Ortega and Rosario Murillo notified –through various signs on the buildings– that the properties now “belong to the Ministry of Health” and were confiscated, without a prior court order

The main management leadership of Nicaragua denounced this a "de facto confiscation" by the State of the private property of two media critical of President Daniel Ortega and of nine NGOs that were outlawed in the context of the socio-political crisis that he is experiencing the country since April 2018. In a statement, the Superior Council of Private Enterprise (Cosep) pointed out to the government of "taking political decisions that violate the rights and constitutional guarantees of Nicaraguans" and cause "legal insecurity and economic and social instability in the country." The Nicaraguan State ceded to the Ministry of Health (Minsa) the buildings where the 100% Noticias television channel operated and that of the digital magazines Confidencial and Niú and the television programs "Esta Semana" and "Esta Noche", which are protected by police officers, as well as nine NGOs. The facilities of these media and those NGOs woke up on Wednesday with the label "this property belongs to the Ministry of Health," according to Efe.

See also 

 Timeline of the 2018 Nicaraguan protests

References 

2014–2018 Nicaraguan protests
2020 in Nicaragua
Nicaragua
Political timelines of the 2010s by year
Nicaragua history-related lists